Abdel-Hakim al-Hasidi is a leading member of the Libyan Islamic Fighting Group and a commander of the 2011 Libyan civil war anti-Gaddafi forces.

Biography
According to The Wall Street Journal, al-Hasidi spent five years in an Afghan training camp. In 2002, al-Hasidi was captured in Peshwar, Pakistan, and was later handed to US forces. He was subsequently held in Libya before his release in 2008. In March 2011, as reported by the Italian newspaper Il Sole 24 Ore, al-Hasidi stated that he had fought against "the foreign invasion" of Afghanistan. In the same interview, al-Hasidi said that his fighters had ties with the militant Islamist al-Qaeda organisation. During the Libyan civil war, al-Hasidi commanded the Abu Salim Martyrs Brigade which consisted of 300 recruits from Derna, Libya.

Politics 
In 2012, al-Hasidi ran for local office in Derna.

References

Sources

Interviews 
 
 
 

Living people
Libyan Islamists
People of the First Libyan Civil War
1996 births
Libyan expatriates in Pakistan